Andreas Merkle (born 17 April 1962) is a retired West German football striker.

References

1962 births
Living people
West German footballers
Stuttgarter Kickers players
VfB Stuttgart players
Hamburger SV players
Association football forwards
Bundesliga players
2. Bundesliga players
Germany under-21 international footballers